Ch'uxña Quta or Ch'uxñaquta (Aymara ch'uxña green, quta lake, "green lake", other spellings Chocñacota, Chocñaccota, Chojña Khota, Choiña Kkota, Chojna Kkota, Chojña Kkota, Chojña Kota, Chojñakhota, Chojñakota) may refer to:

Lakes
 Ch'uxña Quta (Charasani), in the Charazani Municipality, Bautista Saavedra Province, La Paz Department, Bolivia
 Ch'uxña Quta (Curva), in the Curva Municipality, Bautista Saavedra Province, La Paz Department, Bolivia
 Ch'uxña Quta (Murillo), in the Murillo Province, La Paz Department, Bolivia
 Ch'uxñaquta (Carabaya), in the Carabaya Province, Puno Region, Peru

Mountains
 Ch'uxña Quta (Larecaja), in the Larecaja Province, La Paz Department, Bolivia
 Ch'uxña Quta (Pacajes), in the Pacajes Province, La Paz Department, Bolivia
 Ch'uxña Quta (Loayza), in the Loayza Province, La Paz Department, Bolivia
 Ch'uxñaquta (Putina), a mountain at a lake of that name in the Putina Province, Puno Region, Peru